The Ven Gerald Edward Nicolls (1862 – 28 February 1937) was Archdeacon of Lahore from 1909 to 1912.

He was born in Allahabad into a military family and  educated at  Wellington College, Berkshire and Pembroke College, Cambridge. He was  ordained deacon in 1885; and priest in 1886. The following year he married Eleanor, 2nd daughter of Colonel J. B. Hardy, RA: they had four sons and one daughter. He served the Diocese of Lahore at Peshawar, Karachi and Shimla before his time as Archdeacon. Afterwards he was Vicar of  Skirbeck from 1912 to 1915, Winterbourne Down from 1915 to 1923; Bedminster from 1923 to 1927; and Bishopsworth from 1927 until his death on 28 February 1937.

Notes

1862 births
People educated at Wellington College, Berkshire
Alumni of Pembroke College, Cambridge
Christianity in Lahore
Archdeacons of Lahore
1937 deaths